France is a nation that has competed at twenty two Hopman Cup tournaments and first competed in the inaugural Hopman Cup in 1989. Their best results to date came in 2014, when they defeated Poland in the final by two rubbers to one, and in 2017 when they defeated the United States in the final, also by two rubbers to one.

Players
This is a list of players who have played for France in the Hopman Cup.

Results

1 Having already won both singles matches and thus the tie, Germany decided not to compete in the final mixed doubles dead rubber against France, therefore conceding the point to France.
2 In 1993, the French team was forced to retire at 4–2 down in the mixed doubles, thus conceding the point to Germany and losing the tie.
3 In the final tie against Croatia in 1997, Guy Forget was unable to compete in either the men's singles or mixed doubles matches. Both points were therefore conceded to the Croatian team.
4 In their final round robin tie against Italy, France automatically conceded two points due to Virginie Razzano being forced to retire in her singles match and also being unable to compete in the mixed doubles.
5 In the 2012 ties against Spain and the Czech Republic the dead mixed doubles rubbers was not played.

References

Hopman Cup teams
Hopman Cup
Hopman Cup